Spruce View is a hamlet in central Alberta, Canada within Red Deer County. Spruce View is also recognized by Statistics Canada as a designated place.

Demographics 

See also 
List of communities in Alberta
List of designated places in Alberta
List of hamlets in Alberta

References 

Designated places in Alberta
Hamlets in Alberta
Red Deer County